The Hotel Adlon Kempinski Berlin is a luxury hotel in Berlin, Germany. It is on Unter den Linden, the main boulevard in the central Mitte district, at the corner with Pariser Platz, directly opposite the Brandenburg Gate.

The original Hotel Adlon was one of the most famous hotels in Europe. It opened in 1907 and was largely destroyed in 1945 in the closing days of World War II, though a small wing continued operating until 1984. The current hotel, which opened on August 23, 1997, is a new building with a design inspired by the original.

History

First Hotel Adlon
In the late 19th century, European hotels, which generally offered no more than overnight accommodation, evolved to become social gathering places which could host large receptions given by nobility and the wealthy. Modeled on American hotels such as the Waldorf Astoria, new hotel buildings arose all over the continent with lavishly decorated ballrooms, dining halls, arcades, smoking lounges, libraries, and coffeehouses. In 1873 the Hotel Imperial opened in Vienna, followed by the Hôtel Ritz Paris in 1898, and the London Ritz in 1906. In Berlin, the capital of the German Empire, Wilhelmine high society was eager to keep up with their rival metropolitan cities.

In 1905 Lorenz Adlon, a successful wine merchant and restaurateur originally from Mainz, purchased two properties on Unter den Linden. Adlon ran several coffeehouses in Berlin, among others in the Berlin Zoological Garden, and had raised capital to build a hotel on Pariser Platz, at the heart of the German capital. He convinced Kaiser Wilhelm II that Berlin needed a luxury hotel at the level of those in Paris, London and the other European capitals, and so the Kaiser personally interceded with the owners of the Palais Redern, a Neo-Renaissance landmark designed by Karl Friedrich Schinkel in 1830, which sat at Adlon's chosen location. The Kaiser cleared the way for Adlon's purchase of the Palais and for the subsequent demolition of the historic building.

Designed by Carl Gause and Robert Leibnitz, the hotel was built at a cost of 20 million gold marks, two million of which were the bulk of Adlon's personal fortune. Behind a rather sober façade, the hotel was the most modern in Germany with hot and cold running water, an on-site laundry, as well as its own power plant to generate electricity. It boasted a huge lobby with enormous square marble columns, a restaurant, a cafe, a palm court, a ladies' lounge, a library, a music room, a smoking room, a barber shop, a cigar shop, an interior garden with a Japanese-themed elephant fountain, and numerous grand ballrooms.

The new structure had 260 rooms, with 322 beds and 110 bathrooms. Adlon had also purchased the adjoining Hotel Reichshof, opened in 1892, and integrated it into his hotel, adding a further 45 rooms, with 69 beds and 30 bathrooms. This gave the Hotel Adlon a total of 305 rooms, with 391 beds and 140 bathrooms. The hotel was decorated in a mix of Neo-Baroque and Louis XVI styles and furnished by the Mainz company of Bembé, where Lorenz Adlon had been an apprentice carpenter in his youth. It was located in the heart of the government quarter next to the British Embassy on Wilhelmstraße, facing the French and American Embassies on Pariser Platz and only blocks from the Reich Chancellery and other government ministries further south on Wilhelmstraße.

The Adlon opened on October 23, 1907, with the Kaiser, his wife, and many other notables in attendance. It quickly became the social center of Berlin. As the rooms in the Stadtschloss were cold and drafty, the Kaiser paid an annual retainer to keep suites available for his guests. Likewise the Foreign Office used the Adlon for accommodation during state visits, with guests including Tsar Nicholas II of Russia and Maharaja Bhupinder Singh of Patiala. Notable guests of the early years included industrialists such as Thomas Edison, Henry Ford, and John D. Rockefeller, as well as politicians like Walter Rathenau, Gustav Stresemann and the French prime minister Aristide Briand. Many wealthy Berliners lived for extended periods of time in the hotel, while its ballrooms hosted official government functions and society events.

After World War I and the abdication of the Kaiser, Lorenz Adlon remained a staunch monarchist and thus never imagined normal traffic would pass through the Brandenburg Gate's central archway, which had been reserved for the Kaiser alone. He therefore never looked before crossing in front of it. Tragically, this resulted in Adlon being hit by a car in 1918 at that spot. Three years later, he was again hit by a car at exactly the same spot, dying from his injuries a few days later, on April 7, 1921. Lorenz's son Louis Adlon took over management of the hotel with his wife Tilli and their five children. A few months later, at a New Year's Eve party, Louis met Hedwig Leythen, known as Hedda, a German-born hotel guest who had been raised in America. Louis soon divorced Tilli and married Hedda.

During the "Golden Twenties", the Adlon remained one of the most famous hotels in Europe, hosting celebrity guests including Louise Brooks, Charlie Chaplin, Mary Pickford, Emil Jannings, Albert Einstein, Enrico Caruso, Thomas Mann, Josephine Baker, and Marlene Dietrich, and also international politicians such as Franklin Roosevelt, Paul von Hindenburg, and Herbert Hoover. The hotel was a favorite hangout of international journalists, including William L. Shirer, who mentions it frequently in his writings. The hotel's lobby and public rooms were also popular with foreign diplomats.

The hotel remained a social center of the city throughout the Nazi period, though the Nazis themselves preferred the Hotel Kaiserhof a few blocks south and directly across from the Propaganda Ministry and Hitler's Chancellery on Wilhelmplatz. In 1938, financial difficulties forced Louis Adlon to sell the annex of the hotel at 70a Wilhelmstraße, the former Hotel Reichshof, to the government, which converted it to offices for the Reich Ministry of Food and Agriculture.   The Adlon continued to operate normally throughout World War II, even constructing a luxurious bomb shelter for its guests and a huge brick wall around the lobby level to protect the function rooms from flying debris. Parts of the hotel were converted to a military field hospital during the final days of the Battle of Berlin. The hotel survived the war without any major damage, having avoided the bombs and shelling that had leveled the city. On the night of May 2, 1945 a fire, allegedly started in the hotel's wine cellar by drunken Red Army soldiers, left the main building in ruins.

Louis Adlon himself was arrested in his home near Potsdam by Soviet troops on April 25 after they mistook him for a general due to his title of "Generaldirektor". He died on a street in Falkensee on May 7, 1945, of heart failure according to the death certificate.

East German Hotel Adlon
Although the main wing of the hotel on Pariser Platz had been destroyed, the damaged but surviving wings at 70a and 70b Wilhelmstraße reopened for business in August 1945, with 16 guest rooms and a small restaurant in a former function room. Although operating as the Hotel Adlon, it was no longer connected with the Adlon family, as the hotel was now located in the Soviet sector of the city. Instead, it was reported to have been operated by a man named Georg Behlert. On November 22, 1945, a meeting was held in one of the Adlon's surviving ballrooms, which resulted in the formation of DEFA, the state-owned film studio of the future East Germany. By December 1945, 36 rooms had been made habitable for guests. By 1950, the hotel had a staff of 70 and featured a conference hall seating 300, and 100 beds, with plans to add another 30 rooms, with 50 beds.

The hotel was expropriated by the  East German government on December 14, 1950, and the ruined main Pariser Platz wing was demolished. On September 25, 1951, it was announced that a new Hotel Adlon would be constructed on the site, by the state. Construction never began, and after all the other buildings on Pariser Platz were demolished, the square was left as an abandoned, grassed-over buffer with the West, with the Brandenburg Gate sitting alone by the Berlin Wall, constructed in 1961.

In 1955, Hedda Adlon published a popular autobiography, Hotel Adlon. Das Berliner Hotel, in dem die große Welt zu Gast war, which was published in English in 1960 as Hotel Adlon: The Life and Death of a Great Hotel. The book was filmed in German in 1955 as Hotel Adlon by director Josef von Báky, starring Nelly Borgeaud. In 1957, Hedda signed contracts with the Kempinski company, giving them the right to purchase the Hotel Adlon name, and the property, in order to rebuild the hotel, should that ever become possible. Hedda died in 1967.

In 1964, the remaining portion of the Hotel Adlon was renovated by the East German government and the facade was rebuilt. In the 1970s, the hotel closed to guests and was converted to serve mainly as a lodging house for government apprentices. Finally, on March 10, 1984, the building was demolished.

Second Hotel Adlon Kempinski
With the reunification of Germany, Kempinski exercised their rights to the hotel name and the site. After lengthy legal proceedings, they took possession of the property, then sold the development project to Fundus Fonds, a West German investment firm, with Kempinski retaining a long-term lease on the hotel. Fundus Fonds constructed a new hotel between 1995 and 1997. The building, only very loosely inspired by the original, was designed by Rainer Michael Klotz of Patzschke Klotz & Partners, and on August 23, 1997, German President Roman Herzog opened the new Hotel Adlon Kempinski Berlin. The hotel occupies the site of the original building, along with additional adjacent land. Due to its success, it was expanded twice with new wings at the rear on Behrenstrasse, designed by architect Günter Behnisch. The first wing, known as the Adlon Palais, opened in 2003, while the second, known as the Adlon Residenz, opened in 2004.

Location
When it was built, the Hotel Adlon was famously located at Number One Unter Den Linden, as the avenue was numbered starting at the western Brandenburg Gate end. The address was used in the hotel's advertising and became synonymous with it. Beginning in late-1936, the entire Unter den Linden was renumbered, starting from the eastern end, by the Berlin Palace, resulting in the Adlon's address becoming Unter den Linden 77. The current Hotel Adlon Kempinski maintains this address.

In popular culture
 The hotel features prominently in numerous fiction and non-fiction books about the Third Reich, including Joseph Kanon's novel The Good German, Philip Kerr's Bernie Gunther novels, David Downing's John Russell novels, and William L. Shirer's memoir Berlin Diary.
 Greta Garbo's 1932 film Grand Hotel is set in a Berlin hotel inspired by the Adlon. In one of its rooms, she first utters her trademark line 'I want to be alone'.
 A fictional half-ruined pre-war luxury hotel in East Berlin (also inspired by the Adlon), is seen in Billy Wilder's 1961 film One, Two, Three. (Samuel Wilder, called "Billie", later Billy, was a journalist/colleague of Julian Zimmermann, tried in the 1920s to be a gigolo/dancer at the hotel, but gave it up.)
 In the 1972 film Cabaret, Liza Minnelli's character Sally Bowles says she went to "the Adlon" to meet her father, who did not show up.
 The British avant rock band Henry Cow's album Unrest from 1974 has a track named "Upon Entering the Hotel Adlon".
 The hotel appears as a still photograph in the intro for Heil Honey, I'm Home!, a 1990 British sitcom starring Adolf Hitler and Eva Braun that was canceled after one episode for being in bad taste.
 Film director Percy Adlon, great-grandson of Lorenz Adlon made a documentary The Glamorous World of the Adlon Hotel in 1996.
 Much of the Liam Neeson 2011 action film Unknown was filmed at the Adlon, including the final portion.
 Michael Jackson held his then-infant son Prince-Michael "Blanket" II out one of the hotel's windows during a visit to Berlin in November 2002, afterward apologizing "I offer no excuses for what happened, I got caught up in the excitement of the moment. I would never intentionally endanger the lives of my children."
 In the 2011 Doctor Who episode "Let's Kill Hitler", the TARDIS lands in the dining room of the Hotel Adlon in 1938, the Doctor dies there due to River Song's poisonous kiss and she uses her own regeneration energy plus all her future regenerations to resurrect the Doctor, under the eyes of Amy Pond and Rory Williams.
 A three-part drama mini-series set at the hotel entitled  was broadcast on the German television station ZDF in January 2013.
 A documentary Das Adlon – Die Dokumentation (The Adlon: A Documentary) was also broadcast by ZDF in January 2013.

Gallery

See also
 Lorenz Adlon (1849–1921), German hotelier, built Hotel
 Louis Adlon (1908–1947), German-American film actor in Hollywood, grandson of Lorenz
 Hotel Adlon, German film, from book by Louis's father's second wife
 Percy Adlon (born 1935, Munich), German film producer, cousin of Louis, grandson of Lorenz
 Pamela Adlon (born 1966), American actress, daughter-in-law of Percy

References

Further reading

External links

Hotel Adlon Kempinski Berlin official website
Hotel Adlon - Hotel Guide Berlin
 "Adlon-Revue" for the 100th Birthday By Barbara Jänichen Die Welt
 http://adloninteraktiv.zdf.de/
"The Glamorous World of the Adlon Hotel" (1996) – IMDb
"The Glamorous World of the Adlon Hotel, An homage to my own family" PercyAdlon.com

1907 establishments in Germany
1997 establishments in Germany
Hotel Adlon
Hotel Adlon
Hotel buildings completed in 1907
Hotel buildings completed in 1997
Hotels established in 1907
Hotels established in 1997
Hotels in Berlin
Kempinski Hotels
State guesthouses
20th-century architecture in Germany